The  decade of the 1070s in art involved some significant events.

Events
 1070's: Bayeux Tapestry (embroidery) is completed in England, possibly to unveil at the dedication of Bayeux Cathedral in 1077.

Works

 1072: Guo Xi paints Early Spring and Autumn in the River Valley
 1078
 Unknown artist sculpts Bishamonten statue in Hōryū-ji
 Tympanum of Santiago de Compostela Cathedral in Galicia (Spain) sculpted

Births
1073: Ibn al-Tilmīdh, Syriac Christian physician, pharmacist, poet, musician and calligrapher (died 1165)
1076: Fujiwara no Sadazane, Japanese calligrapher during the Heian period (died 1120)

Deaths
 1079: Wen Tong, Chinese Northern Song painter famous for his ink bamboo paintings (born 1019)

References

Art
Years of the 11th century in art